The Koo-Wee-Rup Swamp was a large freshwater swamp located to the south east of Melbourne, Victoria. It drained an area of West Gippsland, with several waterways including Cardinia Creek and the Bunyip River.

The Koo-Wee-Rup swamp originally covered more than 40,000 hectares of dense swamp paperbark (Melaleuca ericifolia), with some open grasslands, reed beds (Phragmites australis) and bullrushes (Typha spp). Known as The Great Swamp, it was an impassable barrier for travellers between Melbourne and Gippsland. Although the fringes of the swamp had been settled by the mid-19th century, farming was not possible on much of the land because of frequent flooding,  and the rapid re-growth of paperbark and other swamp vegetation.

However, in the 1870s, efforts were made by the Victorian Department of Lands to drain the swamp and open up the area for agriculture. A Koo-Wee-Rup Swamp Drainage Committee was formed by local landowners and, in February 1876, excavation of the main channel was commenced, to take water from Cardinia Creek. That channel, leading into Western Port at Moody's Inlet, was 8 km long and 1.2 m deep. Other drains were also dug, including those for Toomuc Creek and the Bunyip River.

See also 
 Strzelecki railway line

Weblinks 
 45 photos in the State Library Victoria
 Channels and channel excavation in the Lang Lang (Koo-wee-rup) district
 Map of Strzelecki railway line, around 1925
 Drains of Koo-Wee-Rup Flood Protection District, 1951

References

Bodies of water of Victoria (Australia)
Swamps of Australia